Monterroso is a municipality in Lugo province in Galicia in north-west Spain.

History
Monterroso was the seat of an important tenencia in medieval Galicia. Among its known tenants were:

Suero Vermúdez (c.1100)
Gutierre Vermúdez (1112)
Munio Peláez (1112–16)
Fernando Pérez de Traba (1140–53)
Gonzalo Fernández de Traba (1157–60), son of the former
Fernando González de Traba (1160–63)
Rodrigo Álvarez (1168)
Gómez González de Traba (1170–73), first time
Gómez González de Manzanedo (1173)
Gómez González de Traba (1189–1200), second time

Municipalities in the Province of Lugo